Parece Fantasía is the fourth (4th) studio album by Puerto Rican singer Yolandita Monge. In 1972 Monge recorded this album which contains the radio hits La Voz Del Silencio and Dos Caminos Diferentes.

The album was first re-issued in 1987 and later in the 90's by the label Disco Hit in cassette format. It is currently out of print in all media layouts.

Track listing

Credits and personnel
Vocals: Yolandita Monge
Producer: Héctor Garrido
Musical Direction and Arrangements: Héctor Garrido

Notes
Track listing and credits from album cover.
Re-released in Cassette Format by Disco Hit Productions/Aponte Latin Music Distribution (DHC-1643)

References

Yolandita Monge albums
1974 albums